Robbie Joseph Magasiva (born 21 May 1972) is a Samoan-New Zealander actor who has starred in several films and as a member of the Naked Samoans comedy troupe. He has also appeared on television and in theatre, and was the co-presenter of New Zealand's Tagata Pasifika with famed athlete, Beatrice Faumuina. Magasiva is also known for his role on Shortland Street as Dr. Maxwell Avia, which he played from June 2009 to July 2012, and for his current role as Will Jackson on the prison drama series, Wentworth, an adaptation of the iconic women prison drama Prisoner. 
Magasiva is the only male actor to appear in all 8 seasons.

Biography
Magasiva, born in Wellington, New Zealand, was raised in a small community west of Apia, Samoa called Tanumapua. His family moved back to New Zealand permanently when he was 10 years old.

After leaving school, he tried his hand at theatre sports and acted in commercials while working as a receptionist at an advertising agency.

Magasiva had his start on television during the 1990s, beginning with comedy. In 1999, he portrayed Mason Keeler in Jackson's Wharf. In 2001 he starred in his first major film, Stickmen, and joined the Naked Samoans. In 2002, he played Mauhúr in Peter Jackson's The Lord of the Rings: The Two Towers. He returned to television in the show The Strip, continued his work with the Naked Samoans, and made a minor appearance in Power Rangers: Ninja Storm, also starring his brother Pua as the brother of Pua's character of Shane Clarke. In 2006, Magasiva co-starred in Sione's Wedding, a comedy film that achieved commercial success in New Zealand. In 2007 he co-starred in the horror film The Tattooist.

He joined the cast of Shortland Street as Dr. Maxwell Avia in 2009. The character was originally called Maxwell Novak but changed to Avia to relate his Samoan descent. He left the series in 2012; he later reprised his role for a one-off appearance in September 2015. 
In October 2012, Magasiva was cast in the new Australian drama series Wentworth, a re-imaging of the classic show Prisoner. He plays Officer Will Jackson. The character's background was also changed when he was cast (originally meant to be an Australian officer). In 2016, he guest starred in TVNZ's Dirty Laundry.

In 2021, Magasiva  stars on the Paramount+ Australia original series, Spreadsheet.

Robbie in 2022 appeared alongside several members of the Wentworth cast at WentworthCon Melbourne.

Personal life
Magasiva is the first son of Salafa and Taufaiula Ropati Magasiva. He has four brothers, Stevan, Miki, twins Pua and Tanu, and adopted sister Trina Magasiva. He inspired his younger brother (Pua) to become an actor, landing him an audition for an alcohol awareness commercial. Pua died aged 38 on 11 May 2019. As a result, Robbie Magasiva flew to Wellington to be with his family. Later he opened up about the devastating loss of his brother and raised mental health awareness.

He has two children, born in 1996 and 2000. Both reside in Auckland, and he looks after the kids week-on, week-off with their mother, Alice Gordon.

In 2011, Magasiva began dating Shortland Street co-star, Natalie Medlock. They first met in 2009 while performing in a play called "Christ Almighty!". Medlock recalls it was her costume that earned Magasiva's heart. In 2015, the pair went on stage again with Christ Almighty with the Wentworth cast to raise money for the homeless. The couple attributes love and therapy for their long-term relationship.

Previously he was married to Anna Magasiva, whom he met while he was a receptionist.

Filmography

Film

Television

See also
 List of New Zealand television personalities

References

External links
Robbie's biography and screenography on NZ On Screen

1972 births
20th-century New Zealand male actors
21st-century New Zealand male actors
Actors of Samoan descent
New Zealand expatriates in Australia
New Zealand male film actors
New Zealand male television actors
New Zealand people of Samoan descent
New Zealand television presenters
Living people
People educated at St. Patrick's College, Wellington